Phoenicurusia is a genus of butterflies in the family Lycaenidae.

References 

Lycaeninae
Lycaenidae genera
Taxa named by Ruggero Verity